Return to Waterloo is the debut solo album by Kinks' leader and chief songwriter Ray Davies. Three of the tracks on the album release were also available in near-identical form on The Kinks' 1984 release Word of Mouth. All of The Kinks appear on the album with the exception of Dave Davies. According to Ray Davies, Dave Davies refused to perform on the album. He later said, "Dave refused to play and so it had to be 'Ray Davies and members of the Kinks'. If he had worked with me on it, it would have been a great record, but he let me down."

An hour-long musical film, Return to Waterloo, was also written and directed by Davies, wherein instead of dialogue, the story is told through music and lyrics. The film features Tim Roth, Kenneth Colley, Valerie Holliman, Dominique Barnes, and (briefly) Ray Davies himself. One song which appears in the film but not on the soundtrack is "Ladder of Success".

Reception

Track listing
All tracks composed by Ray Davies.

"Intro" (0:56)
"Return to Waterloo" (4:40)
"Going Solo" (3:55)
"Missing Persons" (2:53)
"Sold Me Out" (3:19)
"Lonely Hearts" (3:05)
"Not Far Away" (4:23)
"Expectations" (4:06)
"Voices in the Dark (End Title)" (4:22)

Tracks 3, 4 and 5 had been previously featured on the Kinks' 1984 album Word of Mouth in minimally different takes/mixes.

Personnel
Ray Davies – vocals, guitar, piano, synthesizer, gong, sound effects
Ian Gibbons – synthesizer, keyboards, drum and percussion programming, backing vocals
Louisa Davies – vocals "girl's voice"
Valerie Hollerman – spoken word "woman station announcer"
Jim Rodford – bass guitar, backing vocals
Mick Avory – drums
Robert Henrit –  drums; extra percussion on "Voices in the Dark (End Title)"
John O'Donnell – extra percussion on "Voices in the Dark (End Title)"
Technical
Damian Korner, David Baker - engineer

References

Sources

1985 debut albums
Ray Davies albums
Arista Records albums
Albums produced by Ray Davies